NSSC may refer to:
 NASA Standard Spacecraft Computer-I
 Nova Scotia Supreme Court
 U.S. Army Natick Soldier Systems Center
 China's National Space Science Center
 Nuclear Safety and Security Commission
 Nuclear Security Services Corporation 
 Napco Security Technologies